Andrew Moir (born 3 January 1959) is a former Australian rules footballer who played for the Melbourne Football Club in the Victorian Football League (VFL).

Notes

External links 

1959 births
Living people
Australian rules footballers from Victoria (Australia)
Melbourne Football Club players
People educated at Mentone Grammar School